Lummus may refer to:

 J. E. Lummus and J. N. Lummus, bankers who moved to Miami in 1895
Lummus Company, manufacturer of cotton gins, Savannah Georgia
 Lummus Global, a company of Chicago Bridge & Iron Company
 Lummus Island, one of the three islands composing Dodge Island in Miami
 Lummus Park, Miami Beach, in South Beach
 Lummus Park, Miami, in Lummus Park Historic District
 Lummus Park Historic District, a neighborhood in Downtown Miami